Kennaway Lake is a small lake in the municipality of Dysart et al, Haliburton County in Central Ontario, Canada. It is in the Ottawa River drainage basin.

Geography
The nearest named community is Kennaway,  to the north.

There are no inflows. The primary outflow, at the northeast end of the lake, is an unnamed creek that flows as a right tributary to Allen Creek. Allen Creek flows via Benoir Lake, the York River and the Madawaska River to the Ottawa River.

References

Lakes of Haliburton County